Lorenzo E. Darling (August 9, 1829 – December 23, 1895) was a member of the Wisconsin State Assembly.

Biography
Darling was born on August 9, 1829 in Warren Township, Bradford County, Pennsylvania. After residing in East Troy (town), Wisconsin, he moved to Greenville, Wisconsin in 1849 and later to Appleton, Wisconsin, Ellington, Wisconsin and Shiocton, Wisconsin.

In 1854, Darling married Mary E. Morse. They had three children. He died on December 23, 1895.

Career
Darling was elected to the Assembly in 1873. He had previously been an unsuccessful candidate for the Assembly in 1864 and for the Wisconsin State Senate in 1868. Other positions Darling held include county clerk and member of the board of supervisors of Outagamie County, Wisconsin. He was a Republican.

References

External links
1Familytree

People from Bradford County, Pennsylvania
People from East Troy, Wisconsin
Politicians from Appleton, Wisconsin
Republican Party members of the Wisconsin State Assembly
County supervisors in Wisconsin
County clerks in Wisconsin
1829 births
1895 deaths
Burials in Wisconsin
People from Greenville, Wisconsin
People from Ellington, Wisconsin
People from Bovina, Wisconsin
19th-century American politicians